Escribano is a surname. Notable people with the surname include:

Ana María Escribano (born 1981), Spanish women's footballer
Beatriz Escribano (born 1990), Spanish handball player
María Escribano (1954–2002), Spanish composer
Paquita Escribano (1880–1970), Spanish singer

See also
María Escudero-Escribano (born 1983), Spanish chemist
Irene Sánchez-Escribano (born 1992), Spanish steeplechase runner